Franz Peydl (17 March 1907 – 30 March 1977) was an Austrian architect. His work was part of the architecture event in the art competition at the 1936 Summer Olympics.

References

1907 births
1977 deaths
20th-century Austrian architects
Olympic competitors in art competitions
Architects from Vienna